The 1989 San Jose State Spartans football team represented San Jose State University during the 1989 NCAA Division I-A football season as a member of the Big West Conference. The team was led by head coach Claude Gilbert, in his sixth (and last) year as head coach at San Jose State. They played home games at Spartan Stadium in San Jose, California. The Spartans finished the 1989 season with a record of six wins and five losses (6–5, 5–2 Big West).

Schedule

Game summaries

at Miami (FL)

Team players in the NFL
The following were selected in the 1990 NFL Draft.

The following finished their college career in 1987, were not drafted, but played in the NFL.

Notes

References

San Jose State
San Jose State Spartans football seasons
San Jose State Spartans football